Luis Hernández Cabrera (born 23 June 1959) is a Cuban footballer. He competed in the men's tournament at the 1980 Summer Olympics.

References

External links
 

Living people
1959 births
Cuban footballers
Cuba international footballers
FC Ciudad de La Habana players
Association football midfielders
Olympic footballers of Cuba
Footballers at the 1980 Summer Olympics
Place of birth missing (living people)